1Malaysia for Youth, usually stylised as iM4U, was an initiative of the former Malaysian government of Barisan Nasional (BN) led by Najib Razak. It was created to encourage the volunteerism among Malaysian youth.

History
The program launched in July 2012 and in January 2013 the first group of twenty iM4U ambassadors was announced.

DRe1M
In addition to encourage volunteering, 1M4U offers funds to any youth organisations through the Dana Sukarelawan 1Malaysia (DRe1M) initiative. The funds were disbursed according to the submitted proposal.

Number Plate Prefixes 
In conjunction with the 1Malaysia for Youth movement, former Malaysian Prime Minister Dato' Sri Mohammad Najib Razak, introduced a new special prefix of number plates, named 1M4U. Sale of the number plate prefix started on 10 March 2013. The former Malaysian Prime Minister himself was set to get the number plate 1M4U 11, as 11 being his favorite number.

The objective of introducing this special prefix is to raise funds as support for the movement's activities. Some were donated to the Poverty Eradication Foundation, the Malaysian Children's Hope Foundation and the National Athletes Welfare Foundation.

Dissolution
IM4U became dormant and was dissolved after the downfall of BN government in the 2018 general election.

See also
 iM4U fm

References

External links
 

1Malaysia
Youth organisations based in Malaysia
Organizations established in 2012
2012 establishments in Malaysia
Former federal ministries, departments and agencies of Malaysia
Government agencies disestablished in 2018
2018 disestablishments in Malaysia